Landmark Theatres is a movie theatre chain in the United States. It was formerly dedicated to exhibiting and marketing independent and foreign films.
 
Since its founding in 1974, Landmark has grown to 35 theaters with 178 screens in 24 markets. Landmark Theatres is known for both its historic and newer, more modern theaters.  
 
Helmed by President Kevin Holloway, Landmark Theatres is part of Cohen Media Group.

History

1970s
Landmark Theatre Corporation began as Parallax Theatres, which was founded in 1974 by Kim Jorgensen with the opening of the Nuart in Los Angeles, the Sherman in Sherman Oaks, the Rialto in South Pasadena, and the Ken in San Diego. Steve Gilula and Gary Meyer became partners in 1976, as the chain expanded as Landmark.

In 1976, the River Oaks Theatre in Houston (which originally opened in 1939) and the single screen Oriental Theatre in Milwaukee were acquired. The Harvard Exit Theatre in Seattle was acquired in 1979. The film programming in Landmark Theatres was a mix of repertory/revival double-features that changed daily. This mix also included smaller independent and foreign films, and

1980s
In the early 1980s, Landmark reoriented most of their theaters to exhibit first-run specialized, foreign, and re-released classics on longer, open-ended runs. Larger single screens were converted into two or three screen theaters while preserving the external architecture.
 
In 1981, Landmark acquired the Neptune Theatre in Seattle. A year later, Landmark merged with Movie, Inc. of Santa Fe, NM, another small company capitalizing on the excellence of foreign, alternative, and classic films. In 1988, The Oriental Theatre in Milwaukee was converted to a triplex by adding two theaters underneath the balcony. The original artwork of the main auditorium was left untouched. Additionally, Canal Place Cinema (4 screens) opened on the edge of New Orleans' French Quarter, making it Landmark's first new build. 1989 brought a merger between Landmark and the Seven Gables theater circuit from Seattle and Portland. Landmark was purchased by Heritage Entertainment.

1990s
In the early 1990s, Landmark began renovations of its historic buildings, and began developing new multiplex theaters of its own. The new locations included the Westside Pavilion in Los Angeles, the Embarcadero in San Francisco's Financial District, the Embassy in Waltham near Boston, the Plaza Frontenac in St. Louis, the Century Center in Chicago, and the Renaissance in Highland Park near Chicago. In 1998, Landmark was acquired by Silver Cinemas and began operating a small group of discount theaters including the Bell Road, the Superstition, The Yukon, the Golden Triangle, the Macomb, the Joliet, the Budget South, the East Town Green Bay, the Market Square and the Poughkeepsie theaters. Landmark was acquired by the Samuel Goldwyn Company in 1990.

2000s
Landmark was brought out of Silver Cinemas' bankruptcy by Oaktree Capital, allowing the construction and opening of the Sunshine, Bethesda Row and E Street Cinemas. On September 24, 2003, Landmark was acquired by 2929 Entertainment, the Magnolia Pictures¹ exhibition wing folded into Landmark Theatres. Digital Cinema was introduced.

In 2005, Landmark was the first exhibition circuit to deploy Sony 4K cinema; in-theater digital signage was introduced. In Indianapolis, Landmark opened the Keystone Art Cinema & Indie Lounge. The cinema had 7 auditoriums; the lounge featured plasma televisions and allowed all moviegoers to bring their drinks into the auditoriums. And, the Inwood Theater and Nuart Theater were renovated.

2006 brought the introduction of vertical integration with the release of Bubble by Steven Soderbergh. The film played day-and-date, as it was simultaneously released in Landmark Theatres, broadcast on HDNet Movies and sold on DVD.

In 2007, Landmark Theatres acquired the Ritz Theatre Group in Philadelphia which consisted of the Ritz East, Ritz at the Bourse and Ritz V. Landmark opened their flagship theater in Los Angeles, The Landmark. Later that year, Landmark also opened Harbor East in Baltimore and The Landmark Theatre, Greenwood Village in Denver.

In 2008, Landmark held its first live 3D/HD NBA game televised live via satellite to the Magnolia Theatre in Dallas. On March 1, Landmark assumed operation of the 7 screen Gateway Theatre, located in Columbus, Ohio. The theater featured a café, bar, and event space.

The Shattuck Cinemas in Berkeley received a comprehensive remodel in 2009 including new theater seating, lighting and carpets. Lot 68, a bar and café adjacent to the lobby, also opened its doors inside the Shattuck. Landmark entered the 3D arena with 3 locations operating 3D Projection: the Harbor East in Baltimore, the Tivoli in St. Louis and The Landmark in Los Angeles.

2010s
Landmark assumed operation of the Glendale 12 in Indianapolis in 2010 as well as the Olde Town Stadium theater in Arvada, Colorado. In addition, the Piedmont Theatre in Oakland, California was restored, receiving new screens and new auditorium seating in addition to carpets and lighting.

In Spring 2011, Landmark Theatres was put up for sale, and after receiving multiple bids, was taken off the market.

Beginning in 2012, Landmark continued renovating its theaters. The Uptown, Minneapolis, reopened in its new incarnation on September 14, 2012 which included reserved ticketing and full bar service while still preserving a balcony and a 50-foot tower, originally placed to mark the Uptown area. In October 2012, the Chez Theatre, Denver, and the Magnolia, Dallas, were extensively renovated. Upgrades to the theaters included Barco Digital Projection, upgraded digital sound and leather-style seats as well as The Magnolia Bar, a cocktail suite attached to the theater.

Renovations and upgrades continued at many of Landmark's theaters in 2013. The E Street Cinema in Washington, D.C. opened a bar. The Bethesda Row Cinema, MD, located outside of Washington D.C., was completely renovated in May 2013 with new, reserved seating in all eight auditoriums and a full-service bar featuring local brews and film-themed cocktails. Located in downtown Highland Park, Chicago, Landmark¹s Renaissance Place Cinema was renovated in July 2013 with the addition of a full-service bar and lounge, an expanded concession menu and leather seating as well as two screening lounges. The Embarcadero Center Cinema, located in San Francisco¹s financial district, reopened in October 2013 after an extensive remodel which included reconfiguring the theater space to allow for two more theaters, bringing the total screen count to seven; a lounge featuring a wide variety of wine and beer was added as well as stadium seating and four Screening Lounges with electric recliners. Additionally, the Embarcadero was the first movie theater in San Francisco to feature a new assistive listening system for the hearing impaired. Coils were installed in each auditorium that wirelessly send pure sound to hearing aids that have the 'telecoil,' eliminating background noise and the need for a headset.

On November 7, 2013, Landmark Theatres announced that they will open an eight-screen complex in Capitol Point, an emerging mixed-use development along New York Avenue in Washington, D.C.

On January 8, 2014, Landmark announced a six-screen cinema at Atlantic Plumbing, a new mixed-use community at 8th and V Street, also in Washington, D.C. Atlantic Plumbing Cinema, a bar and movie theater, opened October 15, 2015.

On November 20, 2015, Landmark Theatres acquires Albany, New York independent movie house Spectrum 8 Theatres. On December 15, 2015, Landmark acquired the Nickelodeon Theatres, including the Nickelodeon and Del Mar in Santa Cruz, California, and the Aptos Cinema in Aptos, California.

In December 2016, Landmark opened their luxury theatre The Landmark at Merrick Park located in the Shops at Merrick Park shopping center in Coral Gables, Florida. This was the company's first location and currently only location in Florida.

In June 2017, Landmark closed their Seven Gables and Guild 45 theaters in Seattle. The official reason was to prepare for renovation, although local media disputes this saying that the theaters are closed for good.

In September 2017, Landmark opened a new east coast flagship theatre The Landmark at VIA 57 West in Midtown West Manhattan. At the start of 2018, their prior NYC flagship, the Sunshine Cinema, closed.

In April 2018, it was made public that Wagner/Cuban had put Landmark up for sale. The sale was finalized on December 4, 2018 and the theatre chain was purchased by Charles S. Cohen who also owns Cohen Media Group. After the acquisition, Landmark took over booking for another Cohen-owned theater, the Quad Cinema in New York City.

In September 2019, the Guild Theatre in Menlo Park, CA closed.

On October 24, 2019 it was announced that long-time CEO Ted Mundorff had resigned, effectively immediately. Paul Serwitz was announced as the company's new COO and President on October 30, 2019.

2020s

In late January 2020, it was announced that Landmark Theatres would be closing two locations, the Clay Theatre in San Francisco (opened as the Regent 110 years before) and the Ritz at the Bourse in Philadelphia. The last day of business for both locations was January 26, 2020. In February 2020, Landmark ceased
operations at their last single screen theater in San Diego called the Ken Cinema, having acquired it in the 1970’s. In August 2020, Landmark proceeded to close its VIA 57 West location after three years of operation. This was due in part to its distance from public transit.

In June 2021, Landmark Theatres was evicted from Uptown Theatre in Minneapolis, due to unpaid back rent. Also that month, Landmark Theaters ended their lease of the Main Art Theater in Royal Oak, Michigan. In August 2021, it was announced that Landmark had acquired the Scottsdale Quarter luxury multiplex in Scottsdale Arizona which was previously occupied by dine-in-cinema iPic Theatre. In November 2021, it was announced that Landmark had acquired the lease to the former Arclight Cinemas at The Glen Town Center in Glenview, Illinois and that the theater would reopen as part of the company's chain. The location began business the following year.

In April 2022, Landmark assumed operation of the Annapolis Harbour Center.

In May 2022, Landmark ceased operation of their cineplex The Landmark on Pico and The Shattuck Cinemas in Berkeley, and acquired the Playhouse 7 in Pasadena. In September 2022, Landmark opened the Landmark Closter Plaza.

Current Locations

Albany, California
Albany, New York
Annapolis, Maryland
Atlanta, Georgia
Bethesda, Maryland
Cambridge, Massachusetts
Chicago, Illinois
Closter, New Jersey
Coral Gables, Florida
Dallas, Texas
Denver, Colorado
Denton, Texas
Frontenac, Missouri
Glenview, Illinois
Greenwood Village, Colorado
Highland Park, Illinois
Indianapolis, Indiana
Los Angeles, California
Milwaukee, Wisconsin
Minneapolis, Minnesota
New York, New York
Oakland, California
Palo Alto, California
Pasadena, California
Philadelphia, Pennsylvania
San Diego, California
San Francisco, California
Santa Cruz, California
Scottsdale, Arizona
Shoreline, Washington
Washington, District of Columbia

Silver Cinemas
Landmark Theatres also owned the theater chain Silver Cinemas, which primarily showed second-run movies.  Down to just three cinemas entering the COVID-19 pandemic, the final of three Silver Cinemas remaining was transferred to its Landmark nameplate with the other locations closed in 2020 and 2022.

References

External links

Silver Cinemas

Movie theatre chains in the United States
Entertainment companies based in California
Cinemas and movie theaters in Los Angeles
Cinema of Southern California
Companies based in Los Angeles
Companies that filed for Chapter 11 bankruptcy in 2000
Entertainment companies established in 1974
1974 establishments in California
2929 Entertainment holdings